Synergetics is an interdisciplinary science explaining the formation and self-organization of patterns and structures in open systems far from thermodynamic equilibrium. It is founded by Hermann Haken, inspired by the laser theory. Haken's interpretation of the laser principles as self-organization of non-equilibrium systems paved the way at the end of the 1960s to the development of synergetics. One of his successful popular books is Erfolgsgeheimnisse der Natur, translated into English as The Science of Structure: Synergetics.

Self-organization requires a 'macroscopic' system, consisting of many nonlinearly interacting subsystems. Depending on the external control parameters (environment, energy fluxes) self-organization takes place.

Order-parameter concept
Essential in synergetics is the order-parameter concept which was originally introduced in the Ginzburg–Landau theory in order to describe phase transitions in thermodynamics. The order parameter concept is generalized by Haken to the "enslaving-principle" saying that the dynamics of fast-relaxing (stable) modes is completely determined by the 'slow' dynamics of, as a rule, only a few 'order-parameters' (unstable modes). The order parameters can be interpreted as the amplitudes of the unstable modes determining the macroscopic pattern.

As a consequence, self-organization means an enormous reduction of degrees of freedom (entropy) of the system which macroscopically reveals an increase of 'order' (pattern-formation). This far-reaching macroscopic order is independent of the details of the microscopic interactions of the subsystems. This supposedly explains the self-organization of patterns in so many different systems in physics, chemistry and biology.

See also

 Effective field theory
 Josiah Willard Gibbs
 Phase rule
 Free energy principle
 Fokker–Planck equation
 Ginzburg–Landau theory
 Buckminster Fuller 
 Alexander Bogdanov
 Abiogenesis

References

 
 
 
 
 A. S. Mikhailov: Foundations of Synergetics I. Distributed active systems (2nd rev. ed. 1994). Springer Verlag, Berlin, 1990, .
 A. S. Mikhailov, A. Yu. Loskutov: Foundations of Synergetics II. Chaos and Noise, 2nd revised and enlarged edition, Springer Series in Synergetics. Springer, Berlin — Heidelberg 1996 (erste Auflage 1991), .
 Norbert Niemeier "Organisatorischer Wandel aus der Sicht der Synergetik"; Deutscher Universitätsverlag, Wiesbaden, 2000, 
 D.S. Chernavskii: "Синергетика и информация: Динамическая теория информации", 2-е изд. М.: УРСС.

External links
Homepage of the former Institute for Theoretical Physics and Synergetics (IFTPUS)

Holism
Cybernetics
Thermodynamics

es:Sinergia